The Canada Basin is a deep oceanic basin within the Arctic Ocean. It is part of the Amerasian Basin and lies off the coast of Alaska and northwest Canada between the Chukchi Plateau north of Alaska and the Alpha Ridge north of Ellesmere Island.

References

External links
 Image

Oceanic basins of the Arctic Ocean
Oceanography of Canada